Shoal Creek is a stream in Appanoose and Wayne counties of Iowa and Putnam County, Missouri, United States. It is a tributary of the Chariton River.

Prior to channeling of the Chariton the confluence was approximately two miles south of the community of Livonia and on the Putnam-Schuyler county line. The channeling moved the Chariton approximately three-quarter mile to the east resulting in the current confluence being within western Schuyler County.
 
Shoal Creek was so named on account of its shallow depth.

See also
List of rivers of Iowa
List of rivers of Missouri

References

Rivers of Appanoose County, Iowa
Rivers of Putnam County, Missouri
Rivers of Wayne County, Iowa
Rivers of Iowa
Rivers of Missouri